Mafilm was established in 1948. It has been the largest and most significant film studio in Hungary and a strategic base for the Hungarian film industry.  Mafilm's history has lived days of glory, just as it has survived severe deaths. The roots of its birth go back to Kolozsvár, and his ancestors included Europe's third-largest silent film factory. Ever since Korda Sándor (original Hungarian name, later Alexander Korda) founded the predecessor of Mafilm, film production has been going on here without stopping. The importance of the place is also enhanced by the fact that there are almost no Hungarian filmmakers who have not learned the basics of  film profession here. Mafilm's history with its predecessors covers more than 100 years of the history of Hungarian film history.

Antecedents of Mafilm's Formation

Beginning of Hungarian Film Production 
A táncz, that was the title of the film presented at the Uránia Magyar Tudományos Színház in 1901, with which Hungarian cinematography began.

In Transylvania, Hungary, the first film was the Sárga csikó, which was born in 1913 in co-production with  Pathé Film Studio Paris. The French side brought the technical background, while on the Hungarian side the screenplay of the film and the actors were provided by Jenő Janovics, who was director of the Kolozsvár National Theater and later the founder of Mafilm's predecessor. The film became blockbuster with noisy success on all five continents. From 1914, Janovics, in collaboration with Projectograph began producing his highly successful films under the name Proja-film. A tolonc was also one of them, directed by Mihály Kertész, who later won Academy Award, while Mihály Várkonyi played the lead role in the film.

Corvin Film Factory 
Janovics became independent of Projectograph and on October 16, 1916, in Kolozsvár, he founded Corvin Film Factory, the seventh film factory in the world, which, in addition to Pinewood and Cinecitta, became the third most modern, largest film studio in Europe.  Alexander Korda, then 23, was chosen as its chief director.

In April 1917, Korda bought Corvin Film from Janovics, his previous boss.  Miklós M. Pásztory was his partner in the transactions, with whom they soon expanded their film production to Budapest. They chose a then, newly parceled, field in Zugló as the location for their new film studio. On October 16, 1917, the Corvin Film Factory and Film Trade Co. was established. Korda's choice proved to be excellent, and film production has been going on by Mafilm in this place ever since. Corvin's films soon appeared on the international market as well. Korda, in addition to being owner-manager, also directed films regularly. In 1916, his silent film Fehér éjszakák was one of the first Hungarian films to be released abroad. During the boom caused by the World War I, Corvin Film increased its share capital five-fold, but fewer and fewer films were made after the war. In 1922 Corvin Film temporarily ceased production. In 1923 the factory was modernized and reorganized, which became the third largest film studio in Central Europe. However, thanks to the economic downturn in 1926, even this large investment did not help, the Corvin Film Factory could not avoid bankruptcy.

Hunnia Film Factory 
In 1927, the state-established Filmipari Alap bought the Corvin Film Factory. The scope of the new film factory, established on December 19, 1928 under the name Hunnia Film Factory, was clearly and exclusively defined in feature film production. Hunnia’s films were soon able to shoot at the standard of the world's best film studios thanks to state-of-the-art German technology.

The day after the inauguration of the rebuilt Hunnia Film Factory on April 28, 1931, the work was in full swing, Kék Bálvány was shot, the first film of the film studio, which also became the first sound film in Hungarian film history. Hunnia Film Factory was a sole ruler in the Hungarian film industry. Hungary became the third largest film producer in Europe and the fourth largest one in the world. In 1939, made 25 feature films, and four years later 53. By 1944, the Hunnia Film Factory had become a small empire: it had seven studios and was working for 1,300 people continuously. From its foundation, some 20 million meters of film had been shot, and their average budget was 400,000 pengő. In the end, the Second World War did not spare the Hunnia, and its studios were all bombed. However, the management of Budapest provided effective and quick assistance for the renovation of the studio built by Korda. As a result, after World War II, on October 2, 1945, for the first time in Europe, film production resumed at the Hunnia Film Factory. The first film was A tanítónő. After that, however, only a few films were made until nationalization. Nevertheless, the film, made in 1947 and later a world success, directed by Géza Radványi, is definitely worth mentioning Valahol Európában.

History

Mafilm - From Nationalization to Reorganization 
The decree of the Council of Ministers of 19 August 1948 decided on the nationalization of the Hunnia Film Factory under the name of Magyar Filmgyártó Nemzeti Vállalat (Mafilm). The first film released after nationalization, Frigyes Bán's Talpalatnyi föld, was still an international success.

From 1949, film production belonged to the communist minister József Révai. From then on, boring, grey, uncharacteristic semitism dominated the film making.

After Stalin's death, from 1953, film production belonged to Minister József Darvas, and this brought with it a revival of Hungarian cinema. Contributing to the success was the fact that Darvas gave more money in addition to more freedom. The positive changes quickly bore fruit, bringing a new golden age to Hungarian film. For the first time, films from behind the "Iron Curtain" came into the focus of international film art. Zoltán Fábri (Körhinta, Hannibál tanár úr), Zoltán Várkonyi, Viktor Gertler, Félix Máriássy, Károly Makk (Liliomfi), they were members of the new generation of Hungarian film directors who restored the rank of Hungarian film.

The overthrow of the 1956 revolution and the subsequent mass showdown pushed back the promising processes that had begun in the Hungarian film industry. The structure of film production was restructured, and Mafilm continued to operate as Hunnia Filmstúdió. The films made here were mostly apolitical works, mainly literary adaptations. Among them stood out were László Ranódy's three films (Szakadék, Légy jó mindhalálig, Pacsirta) as well as Zoltán Fábri's work, Édes Anna.

At the same time, even the Budapest Filmstúdió was established, and its director, István Nemeskürty, played a key role in becoming an internationally renowned creative workshop. He gathered young talent around him, these young people became the ones who then formed a new, powerful generation of Hungarian film directors. At the film studio, already in the first years after its establishment - without claiming completeness - Zoltán Várkonyi, Félix Máriássy, Miklós Szinetár, Miklós Jancsó and István Gaál could sign films as directors.

Mafilm - Again 
As of January 1, 1964, the film factory formed by the merger of Hunnia Filmstúdió and Budapest Filmstúdió was renamed Mafilm.

The year 1966 also brought about a change in the financing of feature film production. The Ministry of Culture transferred a significant part of the costs of the films to Mokép and Hungarofilm. Two years later, in 1968, the coordination of production and distribution brought the Magyar Filmtröszt to life.

During the following decade, there was such a huge upswing in film production that the Mafilm's studios were not able to serve all the demands. Therefore, the film factory's new 23-hectare studio base was established in the ideal location of Fót.

Hungarian films lived their golden age, their brightest era, in the sixties and seventies. Two generations appeared on the silver screens at the same time: Zoltán Fábri, Miklós Jancsó, András Kovács, Péter Bacsó, Károly Makk, and the youth: István Szabó, Zoltán Huszárik, Pál Gábor, István Gaál, Ferenc Kósa, Sándor Sára and their companions. There were Hungarian filmmakers of the era whose work was considered one of the greatest achievements in universal cinema, including at international level.  Speaking about Miklós Jancsó, many film critics have stated that it is no exaggeration to say that he is also among the first in the world, on an equal footing with Antonioni, or even Bergman.

Film Factories and Film Studios within Mafilm 
In 1972, feature film production was reorganized again. The Hunnia Játékfilmstúdió Vállalat, the Budapest Játékfilmstúdió Vállalat and the Magyar Filmgyártó és Szolgáltató Vállalat were founded. Subsequently, in 1976, the structure formed within Mafilm's organization four years earlier was changed again, three companies were merged again, and then four feature film studios, Budapest, Dialóg, Hunnia and Objektív, were established.

Budapest Film Studio 
István Nemeskürty also managed the re-established  Budapest Film Studio. Gábor Hanák became the head of the studio in 1985. A new generation of young directors started working at the Budapest Film Studio in the 90's, among others Ildikó Enyedi (Golden Camera Award, Cannes), Attila Janisch, Zoltán Kamondi and Dezső Zsigmond, now all well-known and respected directors. In 1992, the film director Ferenc Kardos took over the film studio, and in 1999 the baton fell into the hands of László Kántor, the cinematographer-director who represented the youngest generation of Hungarian film at that time.

Hunnia Film Studio 
The Hunnia was organized under the direction of Miklós Köllő, Pál Sándor took part in the professional work as a deputy leader, and the art council was Ferenc Grunwalsky, Ferenc Kardos, Zsolt Kézdi-Kovács, the later first man of Mafilm, Pál Zolnay and Zsuzsa Bíró, Sándor Csoóri. The film studio was later directed by film director Sándor Simó.

Dialóg Film Studio 
The Dialóg was organized under the leadership of Antal Bogács. Bogács's deputy was Péter Bacsó, the members of the studio's art council were István Dárday, Zoltán Fábri, Imre Gyöngyössy, Miklós Jancsó, András Kovács and Károly Makk, supplemented by playwright János Újhelyi and literary historian Miklós Béládi. From 1982, Péter Bacsó was the director of the film studio, followed by Tamás Tolmár and then Ferenc András.

Objektív Film Studio 
The film studio was established from the Béla Balázs Studio, unlike other Hungarian film production workshops, not on the initiative of the state, but from the independent workshop of young filmmakers, by the joint determination of "aged" film directors.

Almost forty directors shared the film studio's nearly one hundred feature films, and thanks to István Szabó, they managed to win an Academy Awards with Mephisto.

At the beginning, the film team was led by József Marx, his deputy was István Szabó.

On the Edge of the Stump

On the Verge of Disintegration 
In 1987, Mafilm was decentralized. The four studios - Budapest, Dialóg, Hunnia, Objektív - have emerged from Mafilm, gaining complete autonomy.

The Budapest Film Studio, which also served as Mafilm Site II, continued to operate under the name Magyar Mozi és Videofilmgyár (MOVI). In 1998, the walls of the nearly 70-year-old historical creative workshop of the Hungarian film industry were demolished there. Today, international bus station stands in MOVI's place, opposite its main entrance stands on a small memorial stone: "Itt egykor FILMGYÁR állt, a magyar kultúra egyik őrhelye. 1927–1995" ('Here was once a FILM FACTORY, one of the watchtowers of Hungarian culture. 1927-1995.')

In 1989, Mafilm executives opted for a more dynamic, smaller organizational structure. It was then that Mafilm was formed with its majority stake the first film companies: Mafilmrent, Mafilm Audio and Mafilm Profilm.

In 1992, the Magyar Mozgókép Közalapítvány, MMKA (Hungarian Film Public Foundation), a group of 33 film organisations, was founded. In the same year, on 15 June, the Fővárosi Bíróság (Metropolitan Court) found Mafilm was insolvent and declared the liquidation of the film company. On 7 December, the Filmunió, a consortium of state-only institutions, bought Mafilm from the liquidator for 415 million. Following the change of ownership, the new owners retained the name Mafilm and made a huge redundancy. On 1 January 1994, Mafilm was formed into a public limited company with a capital of HUF 500 million.

By 1996, the company was back in bankruptcy. The result of the tender for the privatization of Mafilm in early 1998 was no longer announced by the Horn government in view of the upcoming parliamentary elections. By 1999, Mafilm's ownership structure had been reduced to two-player, with the ÁPV (State Privatization and Asset Management Co.) and MMKA once again re-building state ownership.

MMKA in Power 
In 2004, the Film Act was established (Law II of 2004 on Motion Picture).

In 2006, the government decided to hand over the state-owned Mafilm to the MMKA. Since 2007, Mafilm's asset management has also been transferred to MMKA, which is chaired by Ferenc Grunwalsky and its CEO, Tamas Tolmár.

In November 2009, Mafilm's Huszárik Studio was handed over to Máriássy Studio in Fót. Mafilm's investment of HUF 500 million created the largest studio of the film factory.

In 2010, the mandate of the Film Board of Trustees, MMKA, headed by Grunwalsky expired, and the new chairman became writer Zoltán Kőrösi. In 2011, following due diligence at the foundation ordered by Kőrösi, the government withdrew 20 percent of the foundation's budget, making it insolvent.

In 2012, a government decision terminated the MMKA operating Mafilm.

Restart Again 
Andrew Vajna was appointed Government Commissioner for the Hungarian Film Industry in 2011, and together with Ágnes Havas and Csaba Bereczki, CEO and International Director of the Magyar Nemzeti Filmalap, he put the Hungarian film industry on a completely new footing. In 2012, the Magyar Nemzeti Filmalap consolidated the assets of the defunct Magyar Mozgókép Közalapítvány and settled its debts.

Vajna set three goals in an interview with Film New Europe in Cannes in May 2012, and within a short time he achieved all three. He successfully negotiated with the banks to reschedule the outstanding debts of MMKA, managed to create a clean slate for the film industry;[ managed to get 80 percent of the profits of the Six Lottery automatically transferred to the film fund; and finally, more than doubled the number of films planned for 2012 from four to ten in one year.

From 2012, Tamás Zákonyi became the CEO of Mafilm, succeeded in 2019 by Andrea Ildikó Ottinger. On 1 October 2013, both Mafilm and the Magyar Filmlaboratórium were merged into the Magyar Nemzeti Filmalap, which was then tasked with providing studios and external sets for domestic and foreign film and television productions, as well as prop, costume and weapons rental services. In addition, it was responsible for the rental of office space and the operation of the Budapest and Fót sites.

In January 2014, the renovated Studios III and IV of Mafilm's film factory in Róna Street, were inaugurated with a HUF 300 million grant by the government. In Zákonyi's words at the handover ceremony, the film production facilities offered by the easily accessible, modern and attractive renovated studios enable them to accommodate up to 5-6 productions at a time.

Centenary 
On the centenary of the Film Factory in 2017, the colours of the Hungarian film industry were present at the ceremony commemorating the founding of the film factory a century ago by Korda Sándor and Pásztory M. Miklós in Róna Street. At the time of its founding, Korda surely did not imagine that after all this time, this place – where world-famous film artists have made internationally renowned films – would become an iconic pilgrimage site for Hungarian filmmaking.

The ceremony concluded with a screening of excerpts from Zoltán Fábri's films, followed by the unveiling of a plaque on the façade of the film factory, and the unveiling of the director's name by Studios III and IV.

Structural Changes 
Following the death of Andrew Vajna in 2019, Csaba Káel, the Government Commissioner responsible for the film industry, who renewed Hungarian film production, brought its infrastructure into line with world standards and created predictable management, took over as the Government Commissioner responsible for the development of the Hungarian film industry. Káel was also appointed head of Hungarian film production.

The 2019 CVI Act of establishing the Nemzeti Filmintézet (National Film Institute Hungary, NFI)  contains the necessary amendments to the law for the restructuring of the entire Hungarian film production structure. The essence of the new legislation is that the National Film Institute Hungary will be responsible for the coordinated activities of the entire Hungarian film industry. The National Film Institute Hungary was formed by the merger of the Magyar Nemzeti Filmalap and the Médiamecenatúra Program. As part of the structural change, the Filmiroda, the office that oversees the Hungarian film industry and foreign contractors filming in the country, was removed from the Médiatanács (NMHH) and placed under the Miniszterelnöki Kabinetiroda. In parallel with the above reorganisations, the name of the film company changed several times, with the official website, in early 2020, Mafilm Nonprofit Zrt. and later MAFILM-PROFIL Reklám Kft. while in English they were referred to as Mafilm Hungarian Film Studios. In 2019, 14 films were made in Mafilm's studios in Fót, plus two in the outdoor pool and ten in the outdoor sets. The prop library served 70 productions, while over a hundred film productions borrowed costumes for filming.

Within the National Film Institute Hungary, a five-member Film Selection Committee was set up to decide on the funding of film proposals submitted to the Filmalap, taking into account professional criteria. It takes into account as a fundamental criterion whether the combination of artistic merit and financial feasibility can be optimally achieved in the case of acceptance of a given film proposal.

In August 2021, Káel announced that the government's economic protection action plan had decided to develop studios, unprecedented in the history of Hungarian film production. As an investment of the National Film Institute Hungary, the construction of four new studios in Fót was started on a useful floor area of 9600 square metres. The development will increase the film production capacity in Fót by approximately five times to 12 200 square metres. Thanks to the expansion of the service portfolio, worth more than HUF 40 billion, the Hungarian film industry will be able to shoot its films in practically two separate studios. The development is also intended to consolidate the strategic competitive advantage that Hungary has the largest film production capacity in Europe after London. Káel has set 2022 as the target date for completion of the expansion.

Filmography

List of self-produced films 

Movie title ----- Year ----- Film production company ----- Director  ----- Scenario ----- Cameraman ----- Composer

Films made with Mafilm 
(incomplete list)

Year ----- Title ----- Director ----- Producer

References

Bibliography 

 Lajta Andor. Filmművészeti Évkönyv az 1920. évre. Bp. 1920.
 Dr. Janovics Jenő. A magyar film gyermekévei Erdélyben. Bp. Filmkultura. 1936.
 Nemeskürty István. A mozgóképtől a filmművészetig. A magyar filmesztétika története. (1907 – 1930.) Bp. Magvető Kiadó, 1961.
 Nemeskürty István. A magyar film története. (1912 – 1963.) Bp. Gondolat Kiadó, 1965.
 Nemes Károly. A magyar filmművészet története 1957 és 1967 között. Bp. Magyar Filmtudományi Intézet és Filmarchívum, 1978.
 Langer István. Fejezetek a filmgyár történetéből. I. kötet. 1917–1944. Kézirat. Bp. 1979.
 Nemes Károly. A magyar filmművészet története 1968 és 1972 között. Bp. Magyar Filmtudományi Intézet és Filmarchívum, 1979.
 Nemeskürty István. A képpé varázsolt idő. A magyar film története és helye az egyetemes kultúrában, párhuzamos áttekintéssel a világ filmművészetére. Bp. Magvető Könyvkiadó, 1984.
 Kulik, Karol. Alexander Korda: The Man Who Could Work Miracles. Virgin Books, 1990.
 Szilágyi Gábor. Tűzkeresztség. A magyar játékfilm története 1945–1953. Bp. Magyar Filmintézet, 1992.
 Kőháti Zsolt. Tovamozduló ember tovamozduló világban – a magyar némafilm 1896–1931 között. Bp. Magyar Filmintézet, 1996.
 Szabó Zoltán Attila. Volt egyszer egy Filmgyár. (Mafilm-sztori 1976–2000) Bp. Greger-Delacroix, 2000.
 Cunningham, John. Hungarian Cinema: From Coffee House to Multiplex. London. Wallflower Press, 2004.

Related Pages 

 Corvin Film Factory
 Hunnia Film Factory

Hungarian film studios
Hungarian brands
1948 establishments in Hungary
Film production companies of Hungary